Fritz August Breuhaus (February 9, 1883 – December 2, 1960) was a German architect, interior designer, and designer in the 20th century. He added “de Groot” to the end of his name in 1929. He spread the word of this addition claiming to be the grandson/great-grandson of a reputable painter Breuhaus de Groot. His father, Heinrich Hugo Breuhaus was a dentist and married to his mother Johanne Knipping.

Fritz August Breuhaus was born in Solingen, Germany.  His father tried to influence his career, encouraging him to study mechanical engineering, which he did. He also sat in on architecture lectures and took "Design" (Prof. Theodor Fischer mit Assistent Paul Bonatz), "Decorative design" (Prof. Gustav Halmhuber), "Watercolor painting" (Prof. Treidler). When his father found out he refused to support him any further. Breuhaus was forced to live off a small inheritance from his grandmother.

From 1907 Breuhaus lived and worked in Düsseldorf, where he began the process of designing and planning for the “Garden City Meererbusch”. Breuhaus designed the first house on this  residential area in Meerbusch, Buderich. He also live in “house Eichenhof” for part of the process. The houses were built mainly for businessmen and lawyers, but artists also resided there.

Breuhaus then served in World War I between 1914 and 1918. He achieved the rank of sergeant, serving in both France and the Eastern Front. He published a book in 1917 about his experienced named ‘Der Soldat und der Tod. Gespräch in Versen’.

After 1920, Breuhaus had just divorced from his first wife and returned from war. But his career had picked up momentum, even during the post-war slum (World War I). Breuhaus mostly designed houses and country houses for the upper-class. But in 1923 he had also started his own company “Mikado-garages” which specialized in hand-printed textiles. He also designed furniture, lamps, silverware and wallpaper.

The next step in his career showed off his interior design skills. He worked on the interior of the Bremen luxury liner. But Breuhaus’s is most famous for the interiors of the Hindenburg passenger airship. He used lightweight tubular forms  to create very social space, where people are expected to spend their time in the public space, instead of their cramped cabins. It was from these two projects that Breuhaus used to gain the title of Professor from the Free State of Bavaria. He wanted this title because he understood the promotional value of an academic title.

The ‘little island’, was the house he built for his family in Schmargendorf. The home was functional, simple and sophisticated, much like the rest of his post-war work. The building was surrounded by a courtyard on three sides. He had already designed 50 homes for clients, where he custom designed all the furniture.

Breuhaus died on December 2, 1960, aged 77, in Cologne. He continued working right up till his death. Architect Arthur Gerard, completed any work left undone.

Other work
 1910 country house "Neugrünewald" with two gate lodges for the factory owner O. R. in Solingen (Rhineland), demolished except for gate lodges
 1910 project for a residential complex in the "Villenkolonie Müngersdorf" in Cologne.
 1913 castle for family von R. at the Baltic Sea.
 1914 Werkbund exhibition 1914 in Cologne.
 1920 interior design of his own flat in Cologne.
 1921 castle for Countess von S. in Thuringia.
 1934 summer house in timber construction on the exhibition "Deutsches Volk – Deutsche Arbeit" in Berlin.
 1938 competition design for an administrative and studio district, so-called "UFA-Filmstadt" in (Potsdam-) Babelsberg.
 1940 country house for count P. Y. in Berlin-Dahlem.
 1950 country house "Zu den vier Winden" for the mining entrepreneur V. R. in Weiden near Cologne, demolished in 1970
 1953 residence "Schwalbenhof" for the manufacturer Erich Kiefer in Gärtringen
 1955 Protestant chapel in Glassworks (Taunus)
 1960-1961- House for Udo Giulini in Heidelberg

References
 

Andrea Escher: Living in the countryside – the architect Fritz August Breuhaus de Groot and the Garden City Meererbusch In: Kreis Neuss Heimatbund eV (ed.): Yearbook 2002 for the County Neuss Neuss 2002

John Zukowsky: Design Issues, Vol. 13, No. 3 (Autumn, 1997), pp. 66–81

Dick and Robinson 1985, p. 96.

Breuhaus comprehensive website, http://fritz-august-breuhaus.com/home_en.html Fritz August Breuhaus de Groot website

External links
 Fritz August Breuhaus de Groot website
 Fritz August Breuhaus – Famous Interior Designers
 Passenger accommodations on airship Hindenburg, designed by Professor Breuhaus

20th-century German architects
German interior designers
German designers
1883 births
1960 deaths